The 1966 Utah Redskins football team was an American football team that represented the University of Utah as a member of the Western Athletic Conference (WAC) during the 1966 NCAA University Division football season. In their first season under head coach Mike Giddings, the Redskins compiled an overall record of 5–5 with a mark of 3–2 against conference opponents, placing in a three-way tie for second in the WAC. Home games were played on campus at Ute Stadium in Salt Lake City.

Schedule

Personnel

Season summary

BYU

After the season

NFL/AFL draft
Two Utah players were selected in the 1967 NFL/AFL Draft.

References

External links
 Game program: Washington State at Utah – October 15, 1966

Utah
Utah Utes football seasons
Utah Redskins football